Pavo Marković (born 20 April 1985 in Dubrovnik) is a Croatian water polo player who competed in the 2008 Summer Olympics.

See also
 List of world champions in men's water polo
 List of World Aquatics Championships medalists in water polo

References

External links
 

1985 births
Living people
Croatian male water polo players
Olympic water polo players of Croatia
Water polo players at the 2008 Summer Olympics
Sportspeople from Dubrovnik
World Aquatics Championships medalists in water polo